St. John Vianney Catholic Church is a large parish in Brookfield, Waukesha County, Wisconsin, United States, and is part of the Greater Milwaukee area.  St. John Vianney Catholic Church is part of the Roman Catholic Archdiocese of Milwaukee.

School
The parish operates St. John Vianney School.

Patron saint
Jean Vianney was a French parish priest who became a Catholic saint and the patron saint of parish priests.

Famous parishioners
Paul Ryan

References

External links
St. John Vianney website

Churches in Waukesha County, Wisconsin
Churches in the Roman Catholic Archdiocese of Milwaukee
Schools in Waukesha County, Wisconsin